The Kiiskilä manor is a manor in the former Viipuri rural municipality. It is located on the western shores of the Viipuri Bay, in the Kiiskilä village, approximately 10 km to the southwest of Viipuri. Its name is derived from the Kiiskijoki river, which flows through manor's lands. Of the former estates of the Viipuri surroundings, it is the only one to survive, in addition to Monrepos. The first written mention of the manor is from the 1560s. The manor came to the possession of Leopold Krohn through a marriage.

The Dannenbergs 
In the early 19th century, the manor belonged to the Sesemann family. In 1818, it was bought by Friedrich Dannenberg, who, like the Sesemanns, belonged to the German merchant families of Viipuri. He had the old buildings of the manor torn down and a new main building built. His daughter Julie Dannenberg (1818–1889) married, at the age of 16, Leopold Wilhelm Krohn (1806–1890), the son of a brewery owner from St. Petersburg.

In 1841, Friedrich Dannenberg gave (according to some sources, sold) the Kiiskilä manor to his daughter Julie and his son-in-law Leopold Wilhelm Krohn. The children and grandchildren of Julie and Leopold Wilhelm grew up in the manor. The best known of them were the sons Julius Krohn and Leopold August Krohn, Julius's children Aino Kallas, Helmi Krohn (Setälä), Ilmari Krohn ja Kaarle Krohn. Of them, Aino and Helmi have written on Kiiskilä in their books.

In 1888, Julius Krohn drowned after sailing to the Viipuri Bay from the manor. Soon after, his parents sold the manor, with the furniture and other objects being sold at auction.

That year, the War Accountant Viktor Ahrenberg bought the manor, but the place changed hands many times during the following years. In 1897, it was bought by Wilhelm Breitenstein, who from his mother's side belonged to the Krohn family. Among the best known of his descendants are Wilhelm Breitenstein, Finland's former ambassador to the UN, and Alexander Stubb, Finland's former prime minister.

One of the three-piece suites of the manor is now located in the St. Petersburg room of the Tampere City Hall.

After 1918, the manor belonged to an association called The Invalids of the Finnish Civil War. In 1940 and 1944 the lands of the manor were ceded to the Soviet Union in the Moscow Peace Treaty and in the Moscow Armistice, respectively.

The buildings 
The current main building was built in 1820. It was designed by a French architect named Villiers, who was at the time working in St. Petersburg. The wooden main building represents Palladian architecture, with the six columns of the façade representing the Doric order. In the gable above them, there is a typical window in the shape of a semicircle.

Near the main building, there was a gazebo, built in the Roman style, where Julius Krohn put the finishing touches on his dissertation. The buildings were surrounded by a large English garden, which was the special object of Friedrich Dannenberg's interest.

The primary school 
The first primary school of the Viipuri Rural Municipality was founded in Kiiskilä in 1855, so that the children of Kiiskilä and the children of the neighbouring manors of Possuli (the Örns) and Vainikka (the Ahrenbergs) could have instruction.

The Soviet time and the Russian Federation
The manor is located on the border zone of Russia, and one needs a special permit in order to visit it. During the Soviet times, the manor was owned by a shipyard that functioned in Leningrad, which specialized in submarines. The manor was used by the children of the shipyard employees, and pioneer camps were organized there. The camp was called Chaika, "seagull".

In 2016, a surgeon named Ilya Sleptsov from St. Petersburg bought the mansion, and he has been renovating it ever since. He hopes the renovation work will be completed by 2030. A brewery is already functioning in the manor grounds, producing beer in the style of Abraham Krohn. A collection of statues will be erected in the garden, representing important members of the Krohn family. The ground floor of the main building will function as a museum, representing the history of the manor and its inhabitants. The first floor will contain living quarters.

In 2018, a busload of members of the Krohn family came to visit the manor and to acquaint themselves with the renovation works. The president of the Krohn family association, Mr. Risto Honkanen, was impressed by what he saw. "He [Sleptsov] was well prepared. He has gone ahead with the renovation with reverence and with a big heart."

Sources

References

Literature

Non-fiction
 Krohn, Helmi: Kiiskilän hovi. Otava 1915.
 Nikander, Gabriel (red.): Herrgårdar i Finland III (Monrepos, Kiiskilä och Liimatta). Söderström, Helsingfors 1932. 
 Karkiainen, Tuovi: Kiiskilän kartano on yhä paikallaan "The Kiiskilä manor is still there.". – Karjala nro 24, 16.6.1994.

Works of fiction dealing with Kiiskilä 
 Krohn, Helmi: Isäni Julius Krohn ja hänen sukunsa ("My father Julius Krohn and his family"). Otava 1942.
 Krohn, Helmi: Eeva-Liisa, entisen koulutytön päiväkirja ("Eeva-Liisa, the diary of a one time schoolgirl"). Otava 1943.
 Kallas, Aino: Katinka Rabe, kirja lapsesta ("Katinka Rabe, a book about a child."). Otava 1920.
 Kallas, Aino: Kanssavaeltajia ja ohikulkijoita: Muistoja ja muotokuvia. ("Fellow travellers and passers-by.") Otava 1945.

History of Vyborg
Manor houses in Finland